Haden Place is a historic home located near Tyro, Davidson County, North Carolina. It was built between about 1800 and 1820, and is a two-story, three bay by two bay, transitional Late Federal / Greek Revival style frame dwelling.  Also on the property is a contributing family cemetery dated to the 1820s.

It was added to the National Register of Historic Places in 1984.

References

Houses on the National Register of Historic Places in North Carolina
Federal architecture in North Carolina
Greek Revival houses in North Carolina
Houses completed in 1820
Houses in Davidson County, North Carolina
National Register of Historic Places in Davidson County, North Carolina